John Robertson Gow (born 17 April 1869) was a Scottish footballer who played as an outside forward.

Career
Born in Blair Atholl, Gow played club football for Rangers, and made one appearance for Scotland in 1888. He became club president of Rangers in 1896.

Personal life
His brother Donald was also a Scottish international player.

References

1869 births
Year of death missing
Scottish footballers
Scotland international footballers
Rangers F.C. players
Association football outside forwards
Footballers from Perth and Kinross
Place of death missing
Rangers F.C. chairmen
Chairmen and investors of football clubs in Scotland